Aruküla is a small borough in Harju County, northern Estonia. It is the administrative centre of Raasiku Parish. Aruküla had a population of 2,113 on 1 January 2020. Aruküla has a station on the Elron's eastern route.

Gallery

See also
Aruküla Basic School
Aruküla manor
Aruküla railway station

References

External links

Raasiku Parish 
Aruküla Basic School 
Aruküla Cultural company 
Aruküla SK Handball Club 

Boroughs and small boroughs in Estonia
Kreis Harrien